Urban Life is a bronze sculpture by French artist Val. 
In 2010, this monumental piece was exhibited in front of the Shanghai Art Fair and presented to the Jing'An International Sculpture Project.
Another edition of the same sculpture is erected at Jingan Kerry Center in Shanghai.

See also
 List of public art in Washington, D.C., Ward 6

Bronze sculptures in China